The Chana CM7 or Chana Raimondi (Leimeng, 长安镭蒙) is a microvan produced by Changan Automobile.

Overview

Chongqing Changan Automobile introduced the Chana CM7 minivan on November 23, 2003.

Code-named CM7, and also named Leimeng, the name of the van actually came from its Italian-designer, Raimondi from I.E.G. The official designation of the van is SC6380, and it is also the first self-developed minivan from Changan Automobile which was previously only produces license-built Suzuki Altos and minivans. 

The Chana CM7 rides on a completely new platform at the time and is powered by Suzuki-derived 1.0-liter and 1.3-liter engines producing 39 kW and 60 kW respectively. The CM7 also features standard air conditioning. Production of the CM7 microvan started in January 2004.

References

External links
Chana Global Official website 

CM7
Vans
Microvans
Cars of China
Cars introduced in 2003